Kazbek Ismailovich Paranuk was the acting Prime Minister of the Republic of Adygea, Russia, from 16 September 2006 until 15 January 2007. He was appointed by President Khazret Sovmen four days after Yevgeny Kovalyov was dismissed. He has previously served as Mayor of Adygeysk.

References

Living people
Politics of the Republic of Adygea
People from Adygeysk
Year of birth missing (living people)